Nižné Ladičkovce is a village and municipality in Humenné District in the Prešov Region of north-east Slovakia.

History
In historical records the village was first mentioned in 1478.

Geography
The municipality lies at an altitude of 212 metres and covers an area of 8.549 km².

References

External links
 
https://web.archive.org/web/20070513023228/http://www.statistics.sk/mosmis/eng/run.html

Villages and municipalities in Humenné District
Zemplín (region)